The Prisse Papyrus is an ancient Egyptian papyrus datable to the Middle Kingdom  and is now in the Bibliothèque nationale de France in Paris.
Inhabitants of Kurna originally found the papyrus inside the rishi coffin of pharaoh Sekhemre-Wepmaat Intef of the 17th Dynasty, whose tomb was probably located in Dra' Abu el-Naga' near Thebes.

The papyrus document contains the last two pages of the Instructions of Kagemni, who purportedly served under pharaoh Sneferu of the 4th Dynasty, and is a compilation of moral maxims and admonitions on the practice of virtue (sebayt). The conclusion of the Instructions of Kagemni is followed by the only complete surviving copy of the Instruction of Ptahhotep.

See also
List of ancient Egyptian papyri

References

Literature
The Instruction addressed to Kagemni in M. Lichtheim, Ancient Egyptian Literature, Volume I, 1973, pp.59ff.
The Instruction of Ptahhotep in M. Lichtheim, Ancient Egyptian Literature, Volume I, 1973, pp. 61ff.
"Papyrus Prisse" by  Franz Joseph Lauth retrieved 10:53 24/9/11
papyrus "Prisse" JW Bone (1887) retrieved 11:34GMT 24/9/11
text written-Isaac Meyer retrieved 13:36GMT 25.9.11

External links
 Teaching of Ptahhotep, University College London

Egyptian papyri